Erbessa maera is a moth of the family Notodontidae first described by William Schaus in 1892. It is found in Brazil.

It is a close mimic of Lyces angulosa.

References

Moths described in 1892
Notodontidae of South America